The 10 to 20 ton was a sailing event on the Sailing at the 1900 Summer Olympics program in Le Havre. Six boats started during the three races in the 10 to 20 ton. Seven sailors are documented. The races were held on 1, 5 and 6 August 1900 on the English Channel.

Race schedule

Course area and course configuration 
For the 10 to 20 ton the  course off the coast of Le Havre was used.

Weather conditions

Final results 
The 1900 Olympic scoring system was used. Handicaps were added to each boat's actual time to give a total adjusted time.  The handicaps only had an effect in the third race.

Daily standings

Notes 
Rozenn was penalized by the jury for touching a buoy in race 1. She was awarded a number of points equal to that he would have obtained arriving last, decreases by one point.

Other information 
The races drew a considerable number of spectators and yachts to watch the races in Le Havre. The harbour was packed with different tonnage vessels. Offshore the Fleurus, Cassini, and Mangini destroyers were present. Most of the members of the international jury followed the races aboard the Almee, a yacht owned by Henri Menier.

Further reading

References 

10 to 20 ton
Ton class